is a Japanese illustrator, born November 15 in Hitachi, Ibaraki Prefecture, Japan. She is a graduate of Joshibi University of Art and Design Junior College. Her work includes illustrating the Maria-sama ga Miteru series of light novels.

Works

Light novels
Hibiki is co-creator of the light novel series . The series originated in 2006 as a dōjinshi project by the circle MAGIXX, with related goods sold at that summer's Comic Market. However, by 2007 it had become a commercial publication by Shueisha.

As of May 2009, four volumes of the light novel have been published in Japan:

Shueisha has also released one drama CD for the series:

Illustration
  light novels by 
  light novels by 
  light novels by

Video games
  (2008 PlayStation 2 game, character design)

Other
 Aquarian Age (contributing artist)
 Comic Yuri Hime (cover art)
 First Love Sisters (character design)
 Yuri Shimai (cover art)

Dōjinshi

From 1997 onwards, Hibiki has published dōjinshi through her own circle Russian Blue. Early Russian Blue works were often collaborations with other artists and based on Final Fantasy characters. More recent works include the True Colors series of rough illustrations, which are sold at each Comic Market.

References

External links
   
 Russian Blue Doujinshi DB entry

Manga artists
Maria-sama ga Miteru
People from Hitachi, Ibaraki
Living people
Year of birth missing (living people)